Lalgarh is a small town and a gram panchayat in the  Binpur I CD block under the Jhargram subdivision of the Jhargram district in the Indian state of West Bengal.

Lalgrah came under media attention at the beginning of November 2008. The Communist Party of India (Maoist) launched a massive fight against police personnel and cadres of the Communist Party of India (Marxist). In June 2009 Indian security forces launched Operation Lalgarh against the Maoists in the village.

Geography

Location
Lalgarh is located at

Area overview
Jhargram subdivision, the only one in Jhargram district, shown in the map alongside, is composed of  hills, mounds and rolling lands. It is rather succinctly described in the District Human Development Report, 2011 (at that time it was part of Paschim Medinipur district), “The western boundary is more broken and picturesque, for the lower ranges of the Chhotanagpur Hills line the horizon, the jungle assumes the character of forest, and large trees begin to predominate. The soil, however, is lateritic, a considerable area is unproductive, almost uninhabited, especially in the extreme north-west where there are several hills over 1000 feet in height. The remainder of the country is an almost level plain broken only by the sand hills.” 3.48% of the population lives in urban areas and 96.52% lives in the rural areas. 20.11% of the total population belonged to scheduled castes and 29.37% belonged to scheduled tribes.

Note: The map alongside presents some of the notable locations in the subdivision. All places marked in the map are linked in the larger full screen map.

Demography
According to the 2011 Census of India, Lalgarh had a total population of 4,433 of which 2,259 (51%) were males and 2,174 (49%) were females. Population in the age range 0–6 years was 455. The total number of literate persons in Lalgarh was 3,209 (72.39% of the population over 6 years).

Civic administration

CD block HQ
The headquarters of Binpur I CD block are located at Lalgarh.

Police station
Lalgarh police station has jurisdiction over Binpur I  CD block.

Economy
The main occupation of the people here is cultivation, sharecropping and selling disposable plates made of leaves. Most people do not own land but work on others fields. The region is dry and there are but a single harvest each year. At other times people work as daily labor, collect and sell leaves and wood from forest etc. Over 75% of the households own land given to them under the Land reforms programme of the Left Front Government between the years 1977 and 2002. But income poverty exists.

Operation Lalgarh

In November 2008, following reports of police brutality, enraged advasi villagers blockaded roads and protested against the police and paramilitary forces in the area. The government maintained the movement was being controlled by Maoist guerrilla agents. The Maoists controlled the village and the surrounding area for eight months until Operation Lalgarh was launched to dislodge them on 18 June 2009.

Education
Lalgarh Primary School
Baghakuli Primary School
Chunpara Primary School
Lalgarh Ramkrishna Vidyalaya(H.S)
Lalgarh Sarodamoni Balika Vidyalaya(H.S)
Lalgarh Model School
Lalgarh Government College, which was established in 2014. It is affiliated to Vidyasagar University, and offers honours courses in Bengali, Santali, English, Sanskrit, history, philosophy, political science and sociology, and general courses in BA and BSc (Bio Science).

Healthcare
Binpur Rural Hospital, with 30 beds at Binpur, is the major government medical facility in the Binpur I CD block.

References

External links

An English subtitled documentary on the Lalgarh movement

Conflicts in 2008
2008 in India
Villages in Jhargram district